Shangwua is a genus of flowering plants belonging to the family Asteraceae.

Its native range is from Afghanistan to central and eastern Asia (within East Himalaya, Nepal, Pakistan, Tadzhikistan, Tibet and West Himalaya) and to southern central China and Myanmar.

The genus name of Shangwua is in honour of Shang Wu Liu (b. 1934), Chinese botanist, taxonomist and professor in the province of Qinghai, China. 
It was first described and published in Taxon Vol.62 on page 992 in 2013.

Known species
According to Kew:
Shangwua denticulata 
Shangwua jacea 
Shangwua masarica

References

Cynareae
Asteraceae genera
Plants described in 2013
Flora of Afghanistan
Flora of Tajikistan
Flora of South-Central China
Flora of Tibet
Flora of Nepal
Flora of Pakistan
Flora of West Himalaya
Flora of East Himalaya
Flora of Myanmar